l.e.i. (an acronym that stands for Life Energy Intelligence; the logo is usually uncapitalized, but the newer logo is stylized as L.e.i.) is an American clothing company, mainly targeted at teenage girls and young women.  Launched in 1989, l.e.i. is owned by Jones Apparel Group and is headquartered in Los Angeles, California.  The brand is sold in many retail stores, however they do not have stores of their own.  l.e.i. products are available at Wal-Mart, as well as many online stores.

Products
l.e.i. sells different types of clothes that are aimed at preteen/teenage girls, such as shirts, pants, skirts, and swimwear.  They are most popular for selling jeans.  In addition, l.e.i. has an extensive lineup of shoes and accessories, including jewelry, sunglasses, handbags, and lingerie.

l.e.i. designs clothing that is unique and fashionable for teen girls, proclaiming that they will have style, with a "hint of attitude".

Marketing
Country singer Taylor Swift promoted l.e.i. jeans for Wal-Mart from 2007 to 2009.

References

Companies based in Los Angeles
Clothing brands of the United States
Eyewear brands of the United States
Clothing companies established in 1989
Jeans by brand
1990s fashion
2000s fashion
2010s fashion